Veliki Kozjak or just Kozjak is a mountain cliff in Croatia, located in inland of Dalmatian Zagora.

It belongs to Dinaric Alps, and it stretches over small village Kijevo between towns of Vrlika and Knin.
The highest peak of this cliff is Bat (1207 m), and its southeast peak is Kunica (1101 m) over small village Maovice.

See also 
 List of mountains in Croatia

Mountains of Croatia
Cliffs
Landforms of Šibenik-Knin County